George Byron may refer to:

 George Byron, 6th Baron Byron (1788–1824), English writer and poet Lord Byron
 George Byron, 7th Baron Byron (1789–1868), British naval officer, cousin of the poet
 George Byron, 8th Baron Byron (1818–1870), British army officer
 George Byron, 9th Baron Byron (1855–1917), British army officer
 George Byron, American singer

See also
 George Byron Smith (1839–after 1894), Ontario merchant and political figure
 George Byron Lyon-Fellowes (1815–1876), mayor of Ottawa in 1876
 George Byron Currey (1833–1906), American soldier